Lea Mathilde Skar-Myren (born April 21, 2001) is a Norwegian actress and fashion model.

She became known for playing the lead role Maya in the NRK drama Girls (2013–2015; 2018). Later she has played the lead role Jeanette in the NRK sitcom It's All Relatives (2020–2021), and Monica "Tatærn" in the TV 2 drama Kids in Crime (2022–present).

Myren has also performed as supporting roles in various NRK series, including the sitcom Side om side (2018) and teen drama Blank (2019).

Early life and education
Lea Mathilde Skar-Myren grew up in Oslo as the first daughter of researcher Ane-Marthe Solheim Skar. After attending the upper secondary school Fyrstikkalleen School, she studied drama at Hartvig Nissen School; she graduated the gymnasium in 2020. Myren has later studied physical theatre in Paris, France.

Career
Myren had her first TV appearances in 2009 in NRK's children's TV series Superia, where the episodes contained features where she and other children of the same age guided viewers through a computer game. After that, she played the lead role as Maya in the first season of the NRK drama Girls (2013). For the next four seasons of the series, until 2015, she continued the role as Maya, who was then a supporting role in the production.

She later had a supporting role in an episode of the NRK sitcom Side om side (2018). In 2019, she had several supporting roles in various TV series, including the teen drama Blank and the situation comedy Allerud VGS. In the same year, Myren also had an extra role in "Dottera" at Det Norske Teatret, and worked as lighting designer in Nissenrevyen. The following year, she landed the lead role as Jeanette in the NRK sitcom It's All Relatives.

In 2021, Myren worked as a fashion model for the brand Also Worldwide, and contributed with the promotion of Also Worldwide. Myren also had her first film appearance in Aldri i Livet, and appeared in the music video for Kristian Skylstad's "Never Lose That Childish Glow in Your Eyes".

Filmography

Television

Film

Music video

Commercial

References

External links
 
 

2001 births
Living people
21st-century Norwegian actresses
Norwegian television actresses
Norwegian child actresses
Norwegian soap opera actresses
Norwegian female models
Norwegian film actresses
Actresses from Oslo
Norwegian theatre people
Norwegian children's television presenters
Norwegian scenic designers
Models from Oslo